Having taken power in a coup three months earlier, Muammar Gaddafi faced a mutiny by army and interior ministers Moussa Ahmed and Adam Hawaz, both from the eastern Barqa region. The pair were routed and imprisoned in the first of Gaddafi's many survivals.

See also
1969 Libyan coup d'état
2013 Libyan coup d'état attempt
2014 Libyan coup d'état attempts

References

1960s coups d'état and coup attempts
1969 in Libya
Cold War rebellions
Conflicts in 1969
History of Libya under Muammar Gaddafi
Attempted coups in Libya
Military history of Libya
Muammar Gaddafi
Revolutions in Libya
December 1969 events in Africa